Mimi Omosefe Asom (born December 19, 1997) is an American soccer player who plays for as a forward.

Career

Benfica
On January 14, 2020, she signed with Benfica along with fellow countrywoman Alana O'Neill. She made her debut on February 9, 2020 being subbed on in a 5–0 win over Estoril Praia on the round 14 of the 2019–20 Campeonato Nacional Feminino. She scored her first goal by scoring a poker against Amora for the 2019–20 Taça de Portugal Feminina quarterfinals.

Honours
Benfica
 Taça da Liga: 2019–20

References

External links
 
 Instagram

1997 births
Living people
American women's soccer players
Women's association football forwards
Arna-Bjørnar players
Campeonato Nacional de Futebol Feminino players
S.L. Benfica (women) footballers
Princeton Tigers women's soccer players
Soccer players from Dallas
American expatriate women's soccer players
American expatriate sportspeople in Norway
Expatriate women's footballers in Norway
American expatriate sportspeople in Portugal
Expatriate women's footballers in Portugal
African-American women's soccer players
American sportspeople of Nigerian descent
21st-century African-American sportspeople
21st-century African-American women